Lucien Serge Szpiro (23 December 1941 – 18 April 2020) was a French mathematician known for his work in number theory, arithmetic geometry, and commutative algebra. He formulated Szpiro's conjecture and was a Distinguished Professor at the CUNY Graduate Center and an emeritus  at the CNRS.

Early life and education
Lucien Serge Szpiro was born on 23 December 1941 in the 20th arrondissement of Paris, France. Szpiro attended Paris-Sud University where he earned his Ph.D. under Pierre Samuel. His doctoral work was heavily influenced by the seminars of Maurice Auslander, Claude Chevalley, and Alexander Grothendieck. He earned his Doctorat d'État (DrE) in 1971.

Career
From 1963 to 1965, Szpiro worked as an assistant high school teacher in Paris. From 1965 to 1969, he was an assistant professor (maître assistant) at the University of Paris. From 1969 to 1999, Szpiro worked at the CNRS, initially as an attaché at Paris Diderot University before rising to the rank of a distinguished professor (Directeur de Recherche de Classe Exceptionnelle) at Paris-Sud University. In 1999, he became an emeritus professor (Directeur de Recherche émérite) at the CNRS and moved to the CUNY Graduate Center as a Distinguished Professor. He also held visiting positions at several institutions including Columbia University and the Institute for Advanced Study.

Szpiro was the editor-in-chief of Astérisque from 1991 to 1993 and an editor of the Bulletin de la Société Mathématique de France from 1984 to 1990. He was also head of the commission that oversaw the Société mathématique de France libraries.

Szpiro advised 17 doctoral students, including Ahmed Abbes, Emmanuel Ullmo, and Shou-Wu Zhang.

Research
In the 1970s, Szpiro's research in commutative algebra led to his proof of the Auslander zero divisor conjecture. Together with Christian Peskine, he developed the liaison theory of algebraic varieties.

In the 1980s, Szpiro's research interests shifted to Diophantine geometry, first over function fields and then over number fields. The Institut des hautes études scientifiques described Szpiro as being "the first to realise the importance of a paper by Arakelov for questions of Diophantine geometry", which ultimately led to the development of Arakelov theory as a tool of modern Diophantine geometry exemplified by Gerd Faltings's proof of the Mordell conjecture. Szpiro also showed the link between the positivity of the dualising sheaf of a curve and the Bogomolov conjecture.

In 1981, Szpiro formulated a conjecture (now known as Szpiro's conjecture) relating the discriminant of an elliptic curve with its conductor. His conjecture inspired the abc conjecture, which was later shown to be equivalent to a modified form of Szpiro's conjecture in 1988. Szpiro's conjecture and its equivalent forms have been described as "the most important unsolved problem in Diophantine analysis" by Dorian Goldfeld, in part to its large number of consequences in number theory including Roth's theorem, the Mordell conjecture, the Fermat–Catalan conjecture, and Brocard's problem.

After moving to the CUNY Graduate Center in 1999, Szpiro began working on new research in algebraic dynamics.

Awards
In 1987, Szpiro received the Prix Doistau–Blutel from the French Academy of Sciences "for his work in Commutative Algebra and Algebraic Geometry and for his contribution to G. Faltings’ proof of the Mordell conjecture." In 2012 he became a fellow of the American Mathematical Society. He was a Member of the Academia Europaea.

Death
Szpiro died on 18 April 2020 in Paris, France, from cardiac arrest.

Selected publications

Szpiro, Lucien. Conjecture de Mordell, Séminaire Nicolas Bourbaki 1983/4.

References

External links

Search on author Lucien Szpiro from Google Scholar

1941 births
2020 deaths
20th-century French mathematicians
21st-century French mathematicians
University of Paris alumni
Columbia University faculty
City University of New York faculty
Graduate Center, CUNY faculty
Fellows of the American Mathematical Society
Members of Academia Europaea
Academic staff of Paris-Sud University
Arithmetic geometers
Institute for Advanced Study visiting scholars
Prix Paul Doistau–Émile Blutet laureates
Research directors of the French National Centre for Scientific Research